The Sandy River is a  tributary of Red Lake in northwestern Minnesota in the United States.

See also
List of rivers of Minnesota

References

Minnesota Watersheds

USGS Hydrologic Unit Map - State of Minnesota (1974)

Rivers of Minnesota
Rivers of Beltrami County, Minnesota